Callicercops milloti is a moth of the family Gracillariidae. It is known from Madagascar. The larvae feed on Bauhinia species. They roll the leaf of their host plant.

References

Gracillariinae
Moths described in 1951
Moths of Madagascar
Moths of Africa